The development of states—large-scale, populous, politically centralized, and socially stratified polities/societies governed by powerful rulers—marks one of the major milestones in the evolution of human societies. Archaeologists often distinguish between primary (or pristine) states and secondary states. Primary states evolved independently through largely internal developmental processes rather than through the influence of any other pre-existing state. The earliest known primary states appeared in Mesopotamia c. 3700 BC, in Egypt c. 3300 BC, in the Indus Valley c. 2500 BC, India c. 1700 BC, and in China c. 1600 BC. As they interacted with their less developed neighbors through trade, warfare, migration, and more generalized ideological influences, the primary states directly or indirectly fostered the emergence of secondary states in surrounding areas, for example, the Hittites in Anatolia, the Minoan and Mycenaean states of the Aegean, or the Nubian kingdoms in the Sudan. According to Professor Gil Stein of the University of Chicago Oriental Institute, "The excavations and archaeological surveys of the last few decades have vastly increased both the quantity and quality of what we know about ancient states and urbanism. Archaeologists have broadened the scope of their research beyond the traditional focus on rulers and urban elites. Current research now aims at understanding the role of urban commoners, craft specialists, and village-based farmers in the overall organization of ancient states and societies. Given the immense geographical scope encompassed by the term 'the Ancient World'". The notion of a sovereign state arises in the 16th century with the development of modern diplomacy. For earlier times, the term "sovereign state" is an anachronism. What corresponded to sovereign states in the medieval and ancient period were monarchs ruling by the grace of God, de facto feudal or imperial autocrats, or de facto independent nations or tribal confederations. This is a list of sovereign states that existed between 500 BC and 401 BC.

Sovereign states

See also
List of Bronze Age states
List of Iron Age states
List of Classical Age states
List of states during Late Antiquity
List of states during the Middle Ages

References

-05
5th century BC-related lists